The XTI TriFan 600 is a vertical takeoff and landing aircraft currently under development by XTI Aircraft Company.

Development 

In June 2017, a 65%-scale proof-of-concept began fabrication at Placerville Airport, California, to validate the aircraft's configuration.
Trek Aerospace manufactured the ducts and assembled the 65%-scale demonstrator, only powered by an XTI-Trek Aerospace battery pack. MGM Compro, based in Zlín, Czech Republic, supplied its electric motors and controllers.
It was completed in December 2018 and unveiled in January 2019.

Between January and April 2019, the prototype was ground tested to validate the electric motors, battery systems, ducts, propellers, flight controls, systems, and instrumentation. It first flew tethered on May 2, 2019, and conducted multiple controlled hovers.
Untethered hovering, forward wing-borne flight, and the transition between should follow and four to six months of subsequent testing is scheduled on Deseret UAS's Tekoi test site near Tooele, Utah.

The first full-scale prototype should begin construction before May 2020 and fly at the end of the year.
By May 2019, XTI had 77 reservations, for a $500 million value or $ million for each aircraft.
Development is funded by XTI founder David Brody, private equity investors, and crowdfunding stakeholders.
A funding round took place in September 2018; another should raise $25 million and a third will seek $75 million, for a $175 million total development cost.

In July 2019, the GE Catalyst was selected to power the aircraft.

Design 

The TriFan 600 is a six-seat fixed-wing aircraft powered by three ducted fans: two pivoting on the wing and one in the aft fuselage, lifting the aircraft in 
VTOL.
It will have a 37.7 ft (11.5 m) wingspan and a 38.7 ft (11.8 m) length, with single 6 ft (1.8 m) diameter propellers in the wing ducts and two 5 ft (1.5 m) diameter co-axial propellers in the aft duct.

The hybrid electric propulsion system include a single 1,000 shp (745 kW) Honeywell HTS900 turboshaft driving three generators, powering two 350 hp (260 kW) electric motors for the wing ducts and one each for the aft propellers.
It should reach 340 kn (630 km/h) and cross 650 nmi (1,200 km) in VTOL operations or 1,200 nmi (2,200 km) from a runway.

Specifications

See also

References

External links 
 
 

Hybrid electric aircraft
Tilting ducted fan aircraft